Gauna aegusalis is a moth of the family Pyralidae. It was described by Francis Walker in 1858 and is found in Australia and New Zealand.

References

Moths described in 1858
Pyralini
Moths of Australia
Moths of New Zealand